Boussens is a railway station in Boussens, Occitanie, France. The station is on the Toulouse–Bayonne railway line and the former Boussens-Saint-Girons railway, which closed in 1990. The station is served by TER (local) services operated by the SNCF.

Train services
The following services currently call at Boussens:
local service (TER Occitanie) Toulouse–Saint-Gaudens–Tarbes–Pau

Bus Services

Bus connections are available at the station to Saint-Girons.

References

Railway stations in Haute-Garonne
Railway stations in France opened in 1862